Arantxa Sánchez Vicario and Larisa Neiland were the defending champions, but Neiland did not compete this year as she retired from professional tennis during this season. Sánchez Vicario teamed up with Barbara Schett and lost in quarterfinals to Kimberly Po and Anne-Gaëlle Sidot.

Els Callens and Dominique Van Roost won the title by defeating Kimberly Po and Anne-Gaëlle Sidot 6–2, 7–5 in the final.

Seeds

Draw

Draw

References
 Official Results Archive (ITF)
 Official Results Archive (WTA)

estyle.com Classic